David LaChapelle (born March 11, 1963) is an American photographer, music video director and film director. He is best known for his work in fashion, photography, which often references art history and sometimes conveys social messages. His photographic style has been described as "hyper-real and slyly subversive" and as "kitsch pop surrealism". Once called the Fellini of photography, LaChapelle has worked for international publications and has had his work exhibited in commercial galleries and institutions around the world.

Early life
David LaChapelle was born in Hartford, Connecticut to Philip and Helga LaChapelle; he has a sister Sonja and a brother Philip. His mother was a refugee from Lithuania who arrived at Ellis Island in the early 1960s. His family lived in Hartford until he was 9 years old. He has said to have loved the public schools in Connecticut and thrived in their art program as a child and teenager, although he struggled with bullying growing up. 

He and his family moved to Raleigh, North Carolina, where they lived until he was 14 years old, before returning north to Fairfield, Connecticut. He was bullied in his North Carolina school for his sexuality. When he was 15 years old, he ran away from home to become a busboy at Studio 54 in New York City. 

Eventually he returned to North Carolina to enroll in the North Carolina School of the Arts.

His first photograph was of his mother Helga on a family vacation in Puerto Rico. LaChapelle credits his mother for influencing his art direction in the way she set up scenes for family photos in his youth.

Photographic career

Early fine-art photography
LaChapelle was affiliated in the 1980s with 303 Gallery which also exhibited artists such as Doug Ait. After people from Interview magazine saw his work exhibited, LaChapelle was offered work with the magazine. When LaChapelle was 17 years old, he met Andy Warhol, who hired him as a photographer for Interview while he was still in high school. Warhol reportedly told LaChapelle "Do whatever you want. Just make sure everybody looks good." LaChapelle's images subsequently appeared on the covers and pages of magazines such as Details, GQ, i-D, The New York Times Magazine, Rolling Stone, The Face, Vanity Fair, Vogue Italia, and Vogue Paris.

LaChapelle's work has been called "meticulously created in a high-gloss, color-popping, hyper-realistic style", and his photos are known to, "crackle with subversive – or at least hilarious – ideas, rude energy and laughter. They are full of juicy life." In 1995 David LaChapelle shot the famous 'kissing sailors' advertisement for Diesel. It was staged at the peace celebration of World War II and became one of the first public advertisements showing a gay or lesbian couple kissing. Much of its controversy was due it being published at the height of the don't ask, don't tell debates in United States, which had led to the U.S. government to ban openly gay, lesbian, or bisexual persons from military service. In a long article published by frieze in 1996, the advertisement was credited for its "overarching tone of heavy-handed humor and sarcasm". In September 2011 when the don't ask, don't tell law was finally removed by President Barack Obama, Renzo Rosso, the founder and president of Diesel, who originally had approved and pushed for the advertisement, said "16 years ago people wouldn't stop complaining about this ad. Now it's finally accepted legally."

Awards
1995: "Best New Photographer of the Year" by Frensh photo and American Photo magazines
1996: “Photographer of the Year Award” at the VH-1 Fashion Awards
“Applied Photography of the Year Award” from The International Center of Photography 
1997: Best book Design 
1998: Best “Cutting Edge Essay” and “Style Photography” at Life magazine’s Alfred Eisenstadt Awards for Magazine Photography
1999: Honored in the “Cover of the Year”
2000: Won "Best Video" for Moby's "Nature Blues" at the MTV Europe Music Award

Fine-art photography

Themes in LaChapelle's art photography, which he has developed in his Maui home, include salvation, redemption, paradise, and consumerism. It is clear that LaChapelle's moving in this, "new direction highlights his interest and understanding of both contemporary practice and art history".

LaChapelle's images "both bizarre and gorgeous have forged a singular style that is unique, original, and perfectly unmistakeable." His photographs have been collected in a number of books. LaChapelle Land (1996) was selected as one of 101 "Seminal Photographic Books of the Twentieth Century" and is "highly valued by collectors". His second book, Hotel LaChapelle (1999), was described as a "garish, sexy, enchanting trip". Heaven to Hell (2006) featured "almost twice as many images as its predecessors", and "is an explosive compilation of new work by the visionary photographer." LaChapelle, Artists and Prostitutes (2006), a limited-edition, signed, numbered book contains 688 pages of photographs taken between 1985 and 2005. Artists and Prostitutes was published by Taschen and includes a photograph of the publisher Benedikt Taschen in a sadomasochism scene.

Exhibitions 
In the last decade, LaChapelle has returned to a focus on fine art photography and has exhibited his work in several galleries and museums. LaChapelle has had solo museum exhibitions at the Barbican Museum in London (2002), Kausthaus Wien in Vienna (2002), Palazzo Reale in Milan (2007), Museo del Antiguo Colegio de San Ildefonso in Mexico City (2009), the Musee de La Monnaie in Paris (2009), the Museum of Contemporary Art in Taipei (2010), and the Tel Aviv Museum of Art in Israel (2010), in which he was awarded artist of the year. LaChapelle joined permanent acquisitions at both the National Portrait Museum in London and the Bayerische Staatsoper Portrait Gallery in Munich.

By 2011, LaChapelle had an exhibition at the Lever House in New York and retrospectives at the Museo Arte Contemporáneo de Puerto Rico, the Hanagaram Design Museum in Seoul, and Galerie Rudolfinum in Prague. In the following years, LaChapelle's works were also exhibited at the Los Angeles County Museum of Art in LA (2012), the Musée d'Orsay in Paris (2013), and the National Portrait Gallery in Washington D.C. (2014). His retrospective at Fotografiska Museet in Sweden (2013), was the largest solo artist show the museum had ever exhibited.

In 2014, LaChapelle exhibited his series, 'Land Scape' in New York, Vienna, London, and Paris. Other shows include OstLicht Galerie fur Fotografie in Vienna, Austria, MAC Lima in Peru, Palazzo delle Esposizioni in Rome, and Museo de Arte Contemporáneo in Chile. In 2016, LaChapelle's work was showcased at The Victoria and Albert Museum in London, DSC Gallery in the Czech Republic, at several venues in Montevideo in Uruguay and at the Edward Hopper House in New York.
In 2018, LaChapelle exhibited ten of his series for a couple of months. In one big exhibition, which is named, Good News For Modern Man, in the Groninger Museum (The Netherlands).

Artistic influences
LaChapelle cites a number of artists who have influenced his photography. In a 2009 interview, he mentioned the Baroque painters Andrea Pozzo and Caravaggio as two of his favorites. A critic has noted that LaChapelle's work has been influenced by Salvador Dalí, Jeff Koons, Michelangelo, Cindy Sherman, and Andy Warhol. Richard Avedon noted that of all the photographers inventing surreal images, LaChapelle has the potential to be the genre's Magritte. Helmut Newton has also contributed to the discourse on LaChapelle, stating in a New York Times article by Cathy Horyn "He [LaChapelle] isn't very impressed by current photography. 'There's a lot of pornographic pictures taken by the young today ... A lot of the nudity is gratuitous. But someone who makes me laugh is David LaChapelle. I think he is very bright, very funny, and good'". LaChapelle is Catholic and often uses religious symbolism in his work.

Personal life

LaChapelle has bipolar disorder, but as he feels drugs do not work for him, he is careful to monitor his mental health. In the mid-1980s, LaChapelle lost his boyfriend of the time to AIDS. He relocated to London, where that city's counterculture proved enormously influential in forming his aesthetic. "I thought I'd seen it all. When I went to London, the level of creativity and insanity ... they were on a whole other planet." He was particularly struck by that culture's insistence on originality, rather than copying. For him, Los Angeles had been "the literal opposite". While living in London, he married the female publicist of the UK popstar Marilyn; the marriage lasted a year.

In 2006, LaChapelle abruptly left Los Angeles. He moved to a "very isolated part of Hawaii in this forest. It's off the grid, bio-diesel cars, solar-powered, growing our own food, completely sustainable. I thought 'OK, I'm a farmer now.'" LaChapelle's change in path eventually brought him back to his roots. While in Hawaii, a longstanding colleague invited him to shoot for a gallery, which he hadn't done since his days as a fledgling photographer in New York. "I was really shocked", LaChapelle recalled. "I'm so known as a commercial artist, a big name as a fashion and celebrity photographer, I didn't think a gallery will take me seriously. It's like being reborn; it's like rebirth; it's like starting over. It's back to where I started, where I very first started in galleries when I was a kid. It's just come full circle."

Publications

 LaChapelle Land (New York: Simon & Schuster, in association with Callaway, 1996) - 
 David LaChapelle Exhibition (Palazzo delle Esposizioni, 1999)
 Hotel LaChapelle (Boston: Little, Brown, 1999) - 
 David LaChapelle, Barbican Gallery (Barbican, 2002) 
 David LaChapelle, If You Want Reality, Take the Bus (Artmosphere, 2003)
 David LaChapelle, second edition (Milan: Photology, 2004) - 
 LaChapelle Land, deluxe edition (New York: Channel Photographics, in association with Callaway, 2005) - 
 LaChapelle, Artists and Prostitutes (Köln: Taschen, 2006) - 
 David LaChapelle (Maurani & Noirhomme, 2006)
 LaChapelle, Heaven to Hell (Köln: Taschen, 2006) - 
 David LaChapelle (Firenze: Giunti, 2007) - 
 David LaChapelle: al Forte Belvedere (Firenze: Giunti, 2008) - 
 David LaChapelle (Hamburg: Stern Gruner + Jahr AG & Co., 2008) - 
 David LaChapelle: Jesus is My Homeboy (Robilant & Voena, 2008)
 David LaChapelle: the Rape of Africa (Amsterdam: Reflex, 2009) - 
 David LaChapelle, Delirios de Razon (212 Production, 2009) 
 David LaChapelle, Moca Taipei Catalogue (Pascal de Sarthe & Fred Torres Collaborations for Taipei Culture Foundation/Museum of Contemporary Art, Taipei, 2010) 
 Taschen 30th Anniversary: Golden Book of the Year (Köln: Taschen, 2010) 
 David LaChapelle: Bliss Amongst Chaos (Fred Torres Collaborations, 2010) 
 David LaChapelle, Maybach: Going Places (Daimler AG, 2010)
 Borders and Frontiers (Oakland University Art Gallery, 2011)
 David LaChapelle, Earth Laughs in Flowers (Distanz Verlag, 2011) 
 David LaChapelle: Lost and Found (Pavleye Art and Culture, 2011) 
 Nosotros: La Humanidad Al Borde (Museo de Arte Contemporaneo de Puerto Rico, 2011) 
 Thus Spoke LaChapelle (Arbor vitae, Revnice, and Pavleye Art & Culture, 2011) 
 LaChapelle: Exhibition at Robilant & Voena, London (Robilant & Voena, 2012) 
 David LaChapelle: Earth Laughs in Flowers (Fred Torres Collaboration, 2012)
 David LaChapelle: In Seoul (Fred Torres Collaborations and de Sarthe Gallery, 2012)
 Burning Beauty (BankerWessel, Elanders Faith & Hassler, and Fotografiska) 
 Still Life (Galerie Daniel Templon and Communic'Art, 2013) 
 Land Scape: At Paul Kasmin Gallery (Damiani, 2013) 
 David LaChapelle, Land Scape: At Robilant & Voena (Pure Print, 2014) 
 Once in the Garden at OstLicht: Galerie fur Fotografie, (Brandstatter Verlag, 2014) 
 David LaChapelle: Fotografia1s, (Tarea Asociacion Gradica Educativa, 2015) 
 David LaChapelle: Dopo il Dilulvio, (Giunti Arte Mostre Musei, 2015) 
 Botticelli Reimagined (Harry N. Abrams, 2016) 
 Lost + Found Part I, Taschen, 2017
 Good News Part II, Taschen, 2017
   *David LaChapelle: From Fashion Photography To Fine Art, Forbes Magazine ( Y-Jean Mun-Delsalle)

Films
 Krumped (2004)
 Rize (2005)
 Unity (2015)  Narrator

Videography

 Penny Ford – "I'll Be There" (1994)
 Space Monkeys – "Sugar Cane" (1997)
 The Dandy Warhols – "Not If You Were the Last Junkie on Earth" (1998)
 Kelis – "Good Stuff" (2000)
 Moby – "Natural Blues" (2000)
 Enrique Iglesias – "Sad Eyes" (2000)
 Elton John – "This Train Don't Stop There Anymore" (2001)
 Mariah Carey featuring Da Brat and Ludacris – "Loverboy" (2001)
 Elton John – "Original Sin" (2002)
 The Vines – "Outtathaway!" (2002)
 Christina Aguilera featuring Redman – "Dirrty" (2002)
 Avril Lavigne – "I'm with You" (2002)
 Jennifer Lopez – "I'm Glad" (2002)
 Whitney Houston – "Try It on My Own" (2003)
 Christina Aguilera featuring Lil' Kim – "Can't Hold Us Down" (2003)
 Macy Gray – "She Ain't Right for You" (2003)
 Christina Aguilera – "The Voice Within" (2003)
 Blink-182 – "Feeling This" (2003)
 No Doubt – "It's My Life" (2003)
 Britney Spears – "Everytime" (2004)
 Joss Stone – "Super Duper Love (Are You Diggin' on Me)" (2004)
 Norah Jones – "Those Sweet Words" (2004)
 Elton John – "Answer in the Sky" (2004)
 Gwen Stefani featuring Eve – "Rich Girl" (2004)
 Robbie Williams – "Advertising Space" (2005)
 Elton John – "Someone Saved My Life Tonight" (2006)
 Amy Winehouse – "Tears Dry on Their Own" (2007)
 Jennifer Lopez – "Do It Well" (2007)
 Florence and the Machine – "Spectrum (Say My Name)" (2012)
 Mariah Carey – "Almost Home" (2013)
 Daphne Guinness – "Evening in Space" (2013)
 Queen featuring Michael Jackson – "There Must Be More to Life Than This" (2014)
 Hozier – "Take Me to Church" (2015)
 Britney Spears - "Make Me..." (Unreleased) (2016)

Exhibitions 
 2009: Delirios de Razón (Delusions of Reason), Museo de Las Artes, Guadalajara, Mexico
 2010: Postmodern Pop Photography, Tel Aviv Museum of Art, Tel Aviv, Israel
 2010: David LaChapelle at Museum of Contemporary Art Taipei, Taiwan
 2011: Thus Spoke LaChapelle, Galerie Rudolfinum, Prague, Czech Republic
 2012: Burning Beauty, Fotografiska Museet, Stockholm, Sweden
 2015: David LaChapelle: Dopo Il Diluvio, Palazzo Delle Esposizioni, Rome, Italy
 2016: David LaChapelle: Gas Stations, Edward Hopper House, Nyack, New York
 2016: David LaChapelle: Inscape of Beauty, Ara Modern Art Museum, Seoul, Republic of Korea
 2017: David LaChapelle: Lost + Found, Casa dei Tre Oci, Venice, Italy

Awards 
 Doctorate in Fine Arts (Hon.) from UNCSA, 2015
 Young Photographers Alliance Lifetime Achievement Award
 Artist of the Year, American Friends of the Tel Aviv Museum of Art, 2012
 National Geographic Photography Seminar, Featured Speaker, 2012
 GLAAD Vito Russo Award for Outstanding Contributions Toward Eliminating Homophobia, 2006
 13th Annual MVPA Awards- Winner, Director of the Year- Best Rock Video of the Year for No Doubt's "It's My Life", 2004
 Special Juried Prize Mountain Film, Telluride, 2004
 Special Juried Recognition, Sundance Film Festival, 2004
 Best Documentary, Aspen Film Festival, 2004
 12th Annual MVPA Awards, Adult Contemporary Video of the Year, Elton John's "This Train Don't Stop There Anymore", 2003
 Best Video for Moby's "Natural Blues", the MTV Europe Music Awards, 2000
 Best "Cutting Edge Essay" and "Style Photography" at Life magazine's Alfred Eisenstaedt Awards for Magazine Photography (the Eisies)
 Art Directors Club Award for Best Book Design for LaChapelle Land, 1997

Public collections 
 Bayerische Staatsoper Portrait Gallery, Munich, Germany
 Brandhorst Foundation, Munich, Germany
 Daimler Art Collection, Stuttgart, Germany
 La Monnaie de Paris, Paris, France 
 The Lesbian, Gay, Bisexual & Transgender Community Center, New York, NY
 Los Angeles County Museum of Art, Los Angeles, CA
 Louis Vuitton Moet Hennessy Foundation, Paris, France 
 National Portrait Gallery, London, UK
 Tel Aviv Museum of Art, Tel Aviv, Israel

References

Further reading

External links
 
 

1963 births
Living people
American people of Lithuanian descent
American music video directors
American gay artists
LGBT people from Connecticut
Fashion photographers
Fine art photographers
20th-century American photographers
21st-century American photographers
LGBT Roman Catholics
American LGBT photographers
People with bipolar disorder
University of North Carolina School of the Arts alumni
21st-century American LGBT people